The First Battle of Dalton was a series of American Civil War skirmishes that took place between February 22 and February 27, 1864, in Whitfield County, Georgia.

Battle

At the suggestion of Union Major General Ulysses S. Grant, Major General George H. Thomas, decided to probe General Joseph E. Johnston's strength to determine if the loss of two full divisions to reinforce Confederate forces elsewhere had made the Confederate Army of Tennessee vulnerable to Union attack. On February 22, Thomas began the reconnaissance movement, which consisted of three columns of Union troops. After several days of intense skirmishing, Thomas's army retreated, since it was obvious that Johnston was still capable of repelling a major Union assault. Thomas's force had lost 300 officers and men killed or wounded, against 140 men for the Confederates.

Battlefield condition
Much of the battlefield landscape has been compromised by Interstate 75, development along US Route 41, the growth of the City of Dalton, and subdivision of the Crow Valley and Tunnel Hill areas.

References

External links
 National Park Service battle description Verified 21 February 2018.
 CWSAC Report Update and Resurvey: Individual Battlefield Profiles
History.com
Jenkins, Robert, "Civil War anniversary: The Battles for Dalton Feb. 24-26 and May 7-12, 1864," 150th Civil War Commission, The Daily Citizen.
The War of the Rebellion: A Compilation of the Official Records of the Union And Confederate Armies. Series 1, v.32, pt.1 (Reports)

Battles of the Western Theater of the American Civil War
Confederate victories of the American Civil War
Battles of the American Civil War in Georgia (U.S. state)
Battle of Dalton I
Conflicts in 1864
1864 in Georgia (U.S. state)
February 1864 events